Chris O'Neil (born 14 August 1995) is a Scottish professional footballer who plays as a defender for Stenhousemuir.

Career
O'Neil rejoined Airdrieonians on a permanent deal on 3 May 2018.

Career statistics

References

1995 births
Living people
Scottish footballers
Airdrieonians F.C. players
Brechin City F.C. players
Scottish Professional Football League players
Association football defenders
Stenhousemuir F.C. players